Tu Shou'e or Shou-ngo Tu (1917–2012) was a Chinese aerospace engineer who was a specialist in structural mechanics. Tu is famous as the chief designer of the Long March 2 rocket and China's intercontinental ballistic missile.

Together with Liang Shoupan, Huang Weilu and Ren Xinmin, Tu is considered one of the "Four Elders of China's Aerospace". He was granted the Two Bombs, One Satellite Merit Medal in 1999. Tu was elected a member of the Chinese Academy of Sciences in 1991.

Early life and education 
Tu was born in Nanxun, Huzhou, Zhejiang in 1917. After completing his primary education in Zhejiang, he studied at Shanghai High School. The pervading sense of Japanese menace germinated an idea in his mind that China should have the independent capacity to manufacture planes. He was admitted to Tsinghua University in 1936 and entered its Aeronautical Engineering Department in 1938.

Career 
After graduation, Tu worked at an aeronautical institute in Chengdu. He went to MIT in 1941 with full scholarship and received a master's degree there. Then Tu served Curtiss-Wright Corporation as a stress analyst, but he returned to China following the surrender of Japan in 1945, teaching at his alma mater as an associate professor and then as a professor.

Tu reached Beijing after the university. Since the Adjustment of University Colleges & Departments in 1952, he was assigned to Beijing Aviation Institute. He had served successively as vice dean, dean and the assistant of president there.

Later Tu was invited to serve the Fifth Academy of the Ministry of Defence in 1957. From then on, Tu plunged himself into Chinese missile and aerospace projects, especially its system design aspect. He was the deputy chief designer of Dongfeng 2 and Dongfeng 3, also the chief designer of Dongfeng 5 and Long March 2. He made several significant breakthroughs in the field.

The vicissitudes of his life in the decade never rob his enthusiasm for search. He once completely absorbed in the formula during a struggle session, ignoring the impassioned speech.

Tu felt very sorry for the Columbia disaster in 2003, but he also insisted that the progress of space science is unstoppable, while China "is still on track to launch its first manned spacecraft".

Personal 
Tu joined in the CPC in 1948.

Tu enjoyed tai chi and classic music. He and his wife, Qiu Su, had five children.

References 

1917 births
2012 deaths
Chinese aerospace engineers
Engineers from Zhejiang
Massachusetts Institute of Technology alumni
Members of the Chinese Academy of Sciences
National Southwestern Associated University alumni
Scientists from Huzhou
Space program of the People's Republic of China
Tsinghua University alumni